Maria Mattheussens-Fikkers is a retired field hockey player from the Netherlands. Together with the Dutch team she won a bronze and a gold medal at the 1976 and 1978 World Cups, respectively.

Her daughter, Marieke Veenhoven-Mattheussens (born 1984), also competed internationally in field hockey.

References

1949 births
Living people
Dutch female field hockey players
Sportspeople from Bergen op Zoom